Gibraltar Stronger in Europe was a lobbying group campaigning for Gibraltar to remain in the European Union ahead of the European Union membership referendum, 2016. The group was officially launched on 5 April 2016. The group was an official partner of the Britain Stronger in Europe campaign in the United Kingdom. The group's main aim was to inform the public as to the reasons why Gibraltar should remain in the European Union. All three political parties in Gibraltar pledged their support in favour of the group.

Main Street Office
The Gibraltar Stronger in Europe group had its office on Gibraltar's Main Street and aimed to offer individuals information on the benefits of European Union membership and guidance on registering to vote in the referendum

The Board
Local volunteers in the group were led by Gemma Vasquez, Chair of the Gibraltar Federation of Small Businesses and partner at Gibraltar law firm, Hassans. The other members are: 
 Brian Cardona;
 Albert Danino;
 Dennis Beiso; 
 Ivan Navas;
 Andrew Bonfante;
 Kenneth Cardona
 Caine Sanchez;
 Aaron Santos;
 Samuel Marrache.

See also
 Effect of Brexit on Gibraltar

References

Lobbying in the European Union
Gibraltar and the European Union
2016 United Kingdom European Union membership referendum
Political organisations based in Gibraltar